Rožanj (Serbian Cyrillic: Рожањ) is a mountain in central Serbia, above the town of Gornji Milanovac. Its highest peak Kobiljača has an elevation of 601 meters above sea level.

References

Mountains of Serbia